The big-eared mastiff bat (Otomops papuensis) is a species of bat in the Molossidae family endemic to Papua New Guinea. It is only known from eleven specimens and it is not easy to survey. It forages in rainforest canopy and roosts in tree hollows. It is likely more widespread than currently known but additional research is needed.

Taxonomy
The big-eared mastiff bat was described as a new species in 1948 by American mammalogist Barbara Lawrence. The holotype was collected in 1862.

Description

Overall, its fur is a rich, reddish brown. Individuals hair are darker at the tips and paler at the bases. The underside of its body is lighter in color than its backside, with its throat particularly pale. It has large, rounded ears that lack antitragi; the tragus is very small and scarcely visible. Like some other species of free-tailed bat, there is a connecting band of tissue (interaural membrane) between its ears.

Unlike some closely related genera of free-tailed bat, its upper lip is not wrinkled. The measurements of the holotype were as follows: total length, ; tail, ; forearm, ; ear, ; hind foot, . Overall, it is similar in appearance to the Wroughton's free-tailed bat.

Biology and ecology
It is believed that this species forages for food in the rainforest canopy. It possibly roosts within tree hollows.

Range and habitat
As of 2020, is known from two sites in Papua New Guinea, where it has been found in Gulf Province and Oro Province.

References

Otomops
Bats of Oceania
Endemic fauna of Papua New Guinea
Mammals of Papua New Guinea
Mammals described in 1948
Taxonomy articles created by Polbot
Bats of New Guinea